Vladimir Ivanovich Morozov (sometimes shown as Vladimir Morosov, 4 March 1940 – 8 February 2023) was a Soviet sprint canoeist. He trained at Armed Forces sports society in Krasnovodsk and later in Kiev.

Morozov was born in Krasnovodsk, Turkmen SSR on 4 March 1940. He began canoeing in 1957 and became a member of the USSR National Team in 1963. He won gold medals for the USSR at three consecutive Olympics between 1964 and 1972.

Morozov also won six medals at the ICF Canoe Sprint World Championships with three golds (K-4 1000 m: 1970, 1971; K-4 10000 m: 1966, two silvers (K-1 4 x 500 m: 1963, K-4 1000 m: 1973), and a bronze (K-4 1000 m: 1966). Morozov was awarded two Orders of the Red Banner of Labour (1969, 1972).

Morozov died on 8 February 2023, at the age of 82.

References

Sources

External links 
 
 

1940 births
2023 deaths
Soviet male canoeists
Turkmenistan male canoeists
Ukrainian male canoeists
Canoeists at the 1964 Summer Olympics
Canoeists at the 1968 Summer Olympics
Canoeists at the 1972 Summer Olympics
Olympic canoeists of the Soviet Union
Olympic gold medalists for the Soviet Union
Honoured Masters of Sport of the USSR
Recipients of the Order of Merit (Ukraine), 2nd class
Recipients of the Order of Merit (Ukraine), 3rd class
Armed Forces sports society athletes
Olympic medalists in canoeing
ICF Canoe Sprint World Championships medalists in kayak
People from Türkmenbaşy
Medalists at the 1972 Summer Olympics
Medalists at the 1968 Summer Olympics
Medalists at the 1964 Summer Olympics